Teracotona trifasciata is a moth in the family Erebidae. It was described by Max Bartel in 1903. It is found in Angola and Malawi.

References

Moths described in 1903
Spilosomina